The Warnke Covered Bridge, also known as Warnke Bridge, is a historic covered bridge crossing Swamp Creek in Harrison Township, Preble County, Ohio, northeast of Lewisburg.  Built from 1895 to 1896 by Everett S. Sherman, it has a span of 51 feet.  It was listed on the National Register of Historic Places in 1976.

In 1895, a flood damaged the steel truss bridge that had been built at the same location.  Sherman built a new "Childs Truss covered Bridge." He purchased the stone for the abutments from the Lewisburg quarry.  The bridge was named for a family who lived nearby.

The Warnke Bridge was the last bridge built by Sherman.  After the bridge was completed, Sherman moved to Richmond, Indiana, and died shortly thereafter.

The original cost of the bridge was $459.  Rehabilitation work undertaken in 2008 cost $240,924.25.  At one time, Preble County had 50 covered bridges.  Seven of them, including the Warnke Covered Bridge, remain.

References

Covered bridges on the National Register of Historic Places in Ohio
Bridges completed in 1896
Buildings and structures in Preble County, Ohio
National Register of Historic Places in Preble County, Ohio
Tourist attractions in Preble County, Ohio
Road bridges on the National Register of Historic Places in Ohio
Wooden bridges in Ohio
Truss bridges in the United States